Lotus is the fourth studio album by Elisa, released in 2003. Initially idealized as a live album, Lotus became a mix between a studio album (with six new songs), a greatest hits album (due to the seven songs re-recorded from previous albums) and a cover album (three are the covers). The album is predominantly acoustic; following the initial idea, in fact, the album was completely recorded live.

The album starts with a cover version of Leonard Cohen's song "Hallelujah" from his 1984 album Various Positions. "Sleeping in Your Hand", "Labyrinth" and "The Marriage" are taken from Elisa's 1997 debut album Pipes & Flowers, while "Gift" and "Luce (tramonti a nord est)" are from her second album Asile's World, and "Rock Your Soul" and "Stranger" are from her third album Then Comes the Sun. All of them were revisited in acoustic version, really in contrast with the initial forms. "Femme Fatale" is a cover of a song from The Velvet Underground's first album, The Velvet Underground & Nico, and even it was slowed and changed very much from its initial form, while "Almeno tu nell'universo" was a famous Italian song by Mia Martini.

Track listing
All lyrics written by Elisa except where noted; all music composed by Elisa except where noted.

Certifications
The album was certified four-times platinum in Italy with more than 400,000 copies sold.

References

2003 albums
Elisa (Italian singer) albums